María Díaz may refer to:

 María Alejandra Díaz, Venezuelan politician
 María Rosa Díaz (born 1953), Argentine politician
 Marie-Isabelle Diaz (1898–2011), French supercentenarian